Ungmennafélagið Víkingur, also known as U.M.F. Víkingur or Víkingur Ólafsvík, is an Icelandic multi-sport club from the town of Ólafsvík located on the west coast of Iceland situated on the western end of the Snæfellsnes. It was founded on 6 October 1928.

Football

Men's football
Víkingur men's football team played in the Úrvalsdeild karla, the Icelandic top tier, for the first time in 2013.

History
1928 : Foundation of club
1974 : 2. deild karla [champions]
2003 : 3. deild karla [champions]
2004 : 2. deild karla [promoted]
2010 : 2. deild karla [champions]
2012 : 1. deild karla [promoted]
2015 : 1. deild karla [champions]

The team has spent most of its history in the lowest league, but were promoted to the second tier for the 1975 season, but were instantly relegated back to the third tier, then the lowest tier. They didn't participate every season until recently, sending a merged team with other clubs from Snæfellsnes on occasion, and were last part of such a merger in the 2002 season. They sent a team under their name for the 2003 season and were instantly promoted to 2. deild karla, where they played in 2004 and were promoted again. They finished the 2005 1. deild karla season in a respectable fifth and stayed in that division until 2009, when they were relegated. They won the 2. deild in 2010 to bounce straight back up, finishing 4th, their best ever, in 2011. In the 2012 season Víkingur finished 2nd in the league, 9 points ahead of 3rd, to be promoted to the top tier for the first time. They played in the Úrvalsdeild for the first time in 2013. The team got relegated the following season but will play again in the top division in 2016, after having won the 2015 1. deild karla.

Players

Current squad

Former players 

For details of current and former players, see :Category:Ungmennafélagið Víkingur players.

Basketball

Men's basketball
Víkingur men's basketball team last played in the 2. deild karla during the 2012-2013 season when it finished last in Group A.

Seasons

References

External links
 Official Website
 KSÍ's online record of Icelandic football
 Olafsvikurvöllur on Nordic Stadiums

Football clubs in Iceland
Association football clubs established in 2001
Basketball teams in Iceland
Multi-sport clubs in Iceland